Sefwi Akontombra is a small town and is the capital of Sefwi Akontombra district, a district in the Western North Region of Ghana.

References

Populated places in the Western North Region